Interventions + Lullabies is the first album and second release by American rock band The Format. Produced and recorded by R. Walt Vincent, it was released on October 21, 2003 on Elektra Records. While the album is considered to be quite radio friendly, it did not produce any hit singles. This is possibly due to the absorption of Elektra Records into Warner Bros. Records and Atlantic Records shortly after the album's release.

The album's title originates from the track "I'm Ready, I Am."

Release
In October and November 2003, the group supported Something Corporate on their headlining US tour. Interventions + Lullabies was released on Elektra Records on October 21. In November, the band toured with Straylight Run. "The First Single" was released to radio on January 27, 2004. In March 2004, Elektra was absorbed into Warner Bros. Records and Atlantic Records. This move allowed parent company Warner Bros. to eliminate any artists and employees who were considered a liability, without having to fulfill contractual obligations. The Format first believed themselves to be dropped, but then learned that their contract had been picked up by Atlantic Records. Unfortunately for The Format, Atlantic had decided not to invest any time or money into Intervention + Lullabies and instead instructed them to simply record a second album similar to their debut.  In March and April, the band supported Yellowcard and Something Corporate on their co-headlining tour of the US. In June, the band appeared on a handful of dates on the Honda Civic Tour. For the next two months, they went on a headlining tour across the West Coast and Midwest. They were supported by Steel Train, Reuben's Accomplice, Jenoah, Hellogoodbye, Days Away, Maxeen and Robbers on High Street. In October 2004, they toured the US with Switchfoot and the Honorary Title.

Track listing
All tracks written by Sam Means and Nate Ruess.

 "The First Single" – 4:25
 "Wait, Wait, Wait" – 3:13
 "Give It Up" – 3:52
 "Tie the Rope" – 3:19
 "Tune Out" – 3:31
 "I'm Ready, I Am" – 3:15
 "On Your Porch" – 5:11
 "Sore Thumb" – 3:18
 "A Mess to Be Made" – 3:27
 "Let's Make This Moment a Crime" – 3:51
 "Career Day" – 5:44
 "A Save Situation" – 2:19

References

External links

Interventions + Lullabies at YouTube (streamed copy where licensed)

2003 debut albums
The Format albums
Elektra Records albums